Frenchtown Historic District is a national historic district located at St. Charles, St. Charles County, Missouri.  The district encompasses 205 contributing buildings and 1 contributing structure in the Frenchtown section of St. Charles.  It developed between about 1830 and 1940, and includes representative examples of Greek Revival style, Late Victorian style and Colonial style architecture. The district includes an industrial complex associated with the St. Charles Car Company, founded in 1873, and later known as the American Car and Foundry Company.

It was added to the National Register of Historic Places in 1991.

References

External links

Historic districts on the National Register of Historic Places in Missouri
Colonial architecture in the United States
Greek Revival architecture in Missouri
Victorian architecture in Missouri
Buildings and structures in St. Charles County, Missouri
National Register of Historic Places in St. Charles County, Missouri